Events from the year 1693 in Denmark

Incumbents
 Monarch – Christian V

Events
 4 April Anne Palles, an alleged witch, becomes the last woman to be legally executed for sorcery in Denmark.
 1 December – The Order of the Elephant in its current form is instituted.

Undated
 Christian V's Rosenborg Tapestries are completed.

Births
 16 April – Anne Sophie Reventlow, Queen of Denmark and Norway (died 1743)

Deaths
 12 June Christen Jensen Lodberg, bishop (born 1625)

References

 
Denmark
Years of the 17th century in Denmark